The 14th (Extraordinary) Congress of the League of Communists of Yugoslavia was held from 20 to 22 January 1990, in the Belgrade Sava Centar. The highest organ of both the government and the party, it was the last Congress of the League of Communists of Yugoslavia. It was attended by delegates from all the republics and provinces, as well as a party delegation from the Yugoslav People's Army. The meeting was chaired by President of the Presidency of the Central Committee Milan Pančevski from Macedonia.

Background 

During the 1980s, Yugoslavia has faced a growing political and economic crisis that threatened the very survival of the federation. Conflicting strategies of the future of the nation, based on the republic's capital, Belgrade, the power of the League of Communists, and its debt crisis, finally separated on the 14th Extraordinary Congress in January 1990.

Preparations for congress  

The regular congress of the SKJ should have been held in 1990, although the extraordinary congress was suggested earlier at the 18th session of the League of Communists of Yugoslavia when this proposal was rejected. Then, at the 20th session, the delegation of Vojvodina again proposed the holding of an extraordinary congress, which was again rejected, while the same proposal at the 22nd session was not accepted. There was no single stance on whether this congress should be called extraordinary (the word (iz)vanredni translates directly as extraordinary, but a can be better translated as emergency. Such a name was especially opposed by the Slovenian delegation. On the issues to be addressed, especially those concerning the future organization of Yugoslavia, the congress was indeed remarkable.

Number of participants  

The elected delegates of the congress were 1,457, as follows:

Serbia - 564 (including delegates of Vojvodina: 137 and Kosovo: 94),
Bosnia and Herzegovina - 248,
Croatia - 216,
Macedonia - 141,
Slovenia - 114,
Montenegro - 99
Yugoslav People's Army - 68,
Federation authorities - 7 members
SKJ authorities - 198 delegates

That was the total of 1,655 Congress delegates.

Number of participants of the 1st plenary session
According to the report of the Verification Commission, submitted after the 1st plenary session, 1,601 delegates with voting rights participated in the work of the congress.

Number of participants of the 2nd plenary session
At the beginning of the 2nd plenary session, 1,612 delegates voted in the work of the congress.

The Congress 

During the Congress, any illusions about a united SKJ front that could bring the country out of crisis were dispelled. Instead, the Congress was dominated mostly by clashes between the Serbian and Slovenian delegations over the power and decision-making process of the constituent republics of Yugoslavia. The Serbian delegation advocated for the introduction of a policy of "one man - one vote" with a more centralized Yugoslavia. The Slovenes, however, suggested a confederation party and state, giving more power to the republics. All of the proposals of the Slovenian delegation, led by Milan Kučan, were rejected. At the same time, the Serbian proposals were accepted on a majority vote, helped by Serbia's domination of the votes in Kosovo, Vojvodina and Montenegro.

After two days of sharp verbal conflict, the Slovene delegation walked out of the Sava Center on the 22 January, accompanied by the applause of the Serbian representatives. Immediately thereafter, the head of the delegation from Serbia, Slobodan Milošević, suggested that Congress continue to work and move on to decision-making. However, this was strongly opposed by the delegation from Croatia, who argued that this was unconstitutional. At the prompting of Slobodan Lang, Ivica Račan, head of the Croatian delegation, approached the speaker and declared that "we (the SKH delegation) can not accept the Yugoslav party without the Slovenes". When Milošević asked what it would take to recommence the meeting, the Croatian delegation remarked, "the Slovene delegation", and that if the meeting was recommenced, they too would leave the proceedings. When attempts were made, the Croatian delegation was true to their word, and they too left, joined by the delegations of Macedonia and Bosnia and Herzegovina. At 22.45, Milan Pančevski called the day's proceedings to a close and an adjournment for the following day; however, this did not happen, and the congress was never recalled.

Without party delegations from Slovenia, Croatia, Bosnia and Herzegovina and Macedonia, the congress closed on 30 May 1990, but precisely because of its reduced composition, it is not possible to talk about a legitimate continuation of the congress. Yugoslavia faced an uncertain period after the Congress, without any significant, cohesive force or individual that would lead to some kind of compromise or conciseness. Soon after, the SKJ became defunct after 81 years of existence, ending 45 years of uninterrupted rule and paving the way for free elections. This event was one of the key moments for the beginning of the breakup of Yugoslavia.

Sources

References 
Bilandžić, D. (1999): Croatian Modern History, Zagreb: Golden Marketing
Cohen, LJ (1993): Broken Bonds: The Disintegration of Yugoslavia, Boulder-San Francisco-Oxford: Westview Press
Duka, Z. (2005): Račan - Biography, Zagreb: Profile
Goldstein, I. (2003): Croatian History, Zagreb: Novi Liber
Jović, B. (1996): The Last Days of the SFRY, Izvodi iz dnevnika, Beograd: Politika
Jović, D. (2003): Yugoslavia - the state that has died, Zagreb: Prometheus
Milosavljević, O. (2004): The Antibiography Revolution 1987-1989. godine, u: Fleck, HG, Graovac, I. (ur.)
Dialogue of Historians / Historians, 8, Zagreb: Friedrich Naumann Foundation
Milošević, S. (1989.): Years of Expenditure, Belgrade: BIGZ
Basic directions of SKH's action on society reform and SK, Naše teme, 1990 (3-4): 602-622
Pauković, D. (2008): Pre-election campaign in Croatia in 1990 in the light of Croatian and Serbian news,
Journal of Contemporary History, 2008 (1): 13-31
Ramet, SP (2005): Balkan Babylon. The breakup of Yugoslavia from Tito's death to Milošević's fall, Zagreb: Alinea
Silber, L., Little, A. (1996): Death of Yugoslavia, Opatija: Otokar Keršovani

External links
 Насловна страна Борбе, 22. 01. 1990.
 Насловна страна Вечерњих новости, 22. 01. 1990.
 Насловна страна Политике, 22. 01. 1990.
 Насловна страна Политике, 23. 01. 1990.

1990
Government of Yugoslavia
Politics of Yugoslavia
Socialist Federal Republic of Yugoslavia
1990 in Yugoslavia
1990 in politics
1990 conferences
Congresses of communist parties